Karen Lord (born 22 May 1968) is a Barbadian writer of speculative fiction. Her first novel, Redemption in Indigo (2010), retells the story "Ansige Karamba the Glutton" from Senegalese folklore and her second novel, The Best of All Possible Worlds (2013), is an example of social science fiction. Lord also writes on the sociology of religion.

Biography
Karen Lord was born in Barbados. She attended Queen's College in Bridgetown, and earned a science degree from the University of Toronto and a PhD in the sociology of religion from Bangor University (conferred in 2008, the first year of its independence from the University of Wales).

Novels 

Redemption in Indigo was originally published in 2010 by Small Beer Press, and republished in 2012 by Quercus under its Jo Fletcher Books imprint for SF, fantasy, and horror titles. The New York Times called it "a clever, exuberant mix of Caribbean and Senegalese influences that balances riotously funny set pieces ... with serious drama", the Caribbean Review of Books commented that the novel is "very sprightly from start to finish, with vivid descriptions, memorable heroes and villains, brisk pacing", and it was summed up by Booklist as "one of those literary works of which it can be said that not a word should be changed".

The Best of All Possible Worlds was published by Jo Fletcher Books/Quercus and Del Rey Books/Random House in 2013. One reviewer called it "a thoughtful and emotional novel ... one of the most enjoyable books I've recently read" while Nalo Hopkinson wrote in the Los Angeles Review of Books: "The Best of All Possible Worlds put me in mind of Junot Díaz’s brilliant novel The Brief Wondrous Life of Oscar Wao. Not stylistically: while Oscar Wao is an experimental pelau of modes served up in Díaz’s distinctly Dominicano and in-your-face voice, The Best of All Possible Worlds is a beautiful shape-shifter."

The Galaxy Game, which was released on 6 January 2015 from Del Rey Books/Random House, is described in an early review as "a satisfying exercise in being off-balance, a visceral lesson in how to fall forward and catch yourself in an amazing new place." Publishers Weekly refers to it as a "subtle, cerebral novel", while The Guardian reviewer writes that "the novel is a leisurely exploration of multiple societies, power-politics and race relations, in which discursive plot lines deceive before cohering in a satisfying finale."

Short stories
Lord's short story "Hiraeth: A Tragedy in Four Acts" was published in the anthology Reach for Infinity, edited by Jonathan Strahan (2014), and she contributed the short story "Cities of the Sun" to Margaret Busby's 2019 anthology New Daughters of Africa.

Awards 
Redemption in Indigo won the 2008 Frank Collymore Literary Endowment Award for Best Unpublished Manuscript, the 2010 Carl Brandon Society Parallax Award, the 2011 Crawford Award, the 2011 Mythopoeic Award, and the 2012 Kitschies Golden Tentacle Award for the Best Debut Novel.

Redemption in Indigo was also nominated for the 2011 World Fantasy Award for Best Novel and for the John W. Campbell Award for Best New Writer, and longlisted for the 2011 OCM Bocas Prize for Caribbean Literature.

Bibliography

Novels
 Redemption in Indigo. Small Beer Press, 2010. Jo Fletcher Books, 2012.
 The Best of All Possible Worlds. Jo Fletcher Books (hardback ; paperback ), 2013.
 
 Unravelling. DAW Books, 2019.
Reprints/other editions

As editor
 New Worlds, Old Ways: Speculative Tales from the Caribbean. Peepal Tree Press, 2016;

Critical studies and reviews of Lord's work
The best of all possible worlds
 
The Galaxy Game

Interviews
 "Always a New World: A Conversation with Karen Lord" (interview, Clarkesworld Magazine, February 2013)
 "Conversations with Richard Fidler" (featuring Karen Lord) (radio interview, ABC, Australia, 5 March 2013)
 "Karen Lord: Interview with Gavin Grant" (interview, BookPage, 2013)
 The Spaces Between the Words: Conversations with Writers (a podcast series affiliated with the Literatures in English section at The University of the West Indies, St Augustine Campus and The Caribbean Review of Books)
 "Nalo Hopkinson and Karen Lord in Conversation: Caribbean Folklore, Lovecraft, and More" (Locus Roundtable Podcast with Karen Burnham, 4 November 2011)
 Podcast Interview on Bibliophile Stalker (with Charles Tan), 4 November 2011
 Interview with Chesya Burke at the World SF Blog, 29 August 2011
 "Karen Burnham and Karen Lord in Conversation: Science, Communication, and Society" (Locus Roundtable Podcast), 3 August 2011
 "Karen Lord: Dual Reality": Excerpts from an interview in Locus Magazine, 11 August 2011
 Jeremy L. C. Jones, "Always a New World: A Conversation with Karen Lord", Clarkesworld Magazine, Issue 77, February 2013.

References

External links 

 Karen Lord official website
 Karen Lord at Tumblr
 Karen Lord at Small Beer Press
 "Joint Review: The Best of All Possible Worlds by Karen Lord", The Book Smugglers, 1 February 2013
 
 

1968 births
20th-century Barbadian writers
20th-century Barbadian women writers
21st-century Barbadian writers
21st-century Barbadian women writers
21st-century novelists
Afrofuturist writers
Alumni of Bangor University
Alumni of the University of Wales
Barbadian fantasy writers
Barbadian novelists
Barbadian science fiction writers
Barbadian women writers
Living people
Sociologists of religion
University of Toronto alumni
Women science fiction and fantasy writers
Women short story writers
Women novelists